France competed at the 1980 Winter Paralympics in Geilo, Norway. 21 competitors (19 men and 2 women) won 3 medals, including 1 gold, 1 silver and 1 bronze. France finished 9th in the medal table.

Alpine skiing 

The medalists are:

  Bernard Baudean Men's Giant Slalom 2B
  Remy Arnod Men's Slalom 2A

Cross-country skiing 

The medalists are:

  Gerard Vandel Men's Short Distance 5 km 2A

Ice sledge speed racing 

Two athletes (Claude Ebner and Aime Planchon) represented France in ice sledge speed racing at the 1980 Winter Paralympics. No medals were won.

See also 

 France at the Paralympics
 France at the 1980 Summer Paralympics

References 

France at the Paralympics
1980 in French sport
Nations at the 1980 Winter Paralympics